The National Health Research Institutes (NHRI) in Zhunan Township, Miaoli County, Taiwan, is a non-profit foundation dedicated to medical research and improved healthcare in Taiwan. Established by the Taiwan government in 1995, NHRI is under the supervision of the Ministry of Health and Welfare.

Organisation
NHRI currently has 11 research units:

Research Units
 National Institute of Cancer Research
 Taiwan Cooperative Oncology Group, TCOG
 Institute of Cellular and System Medicine
 Institute of Population Health Sciences
 Institute of Biotechnology and Pharmaceutical Research
 Institute of Molecular and Genomic Medicine
 National Institute of Infectious Diseases and Vaccinology
 National Institute of Environmental Health Sciences
 Institute of Biomedical Engineering and Nanomedicine
 Immunology Research Center
 Center for Neuropsychiatric Research

See also 
 Ministry of Health and Welfare (Taiwan)
 Healthcare in Taiwan

References

External links
 Official website

1995 establishments in Taiwan
Executive Yuan
Medical research institutes in Taiwan
Miaoli County
Research institutes established in 1995